Jean-Claude Iranzi (born 5 October 1990) is a Rwandan professional footballer who plays for Rayon Sports in Rwanda Premier League.

Club career

Kiyovu Sport
Iranzi was born in Kigali. He began his career in 2004 with SC Kiyovu Sport and was promoted in the 2006 Rwandan Premier League team. He made his debut for Kiyovu Sport in June 2006.

APR FC
In December 2008, Iranzi signed with APR FC, the previous winners of the Rwandan Premier League. He made his APR FC debut in an organised friendly match against fellow league members Police FC. With APR, Iranzi won the 2009–10 Rwandan Premier League, thus earning a spot in the 2011 CAF Champions League, where APR was eliminated in the Preliminary round to Club Africain of Tunisia on an aggregate score of 2–6. APR repeated as Premier League champions in 2010–11, and therefore played in the 2012 CAF Champions League.

International career
Iranzi played the African U-20 Youth Championship in Rwanda. He played his debut for the "Wasps" on 21 June 2008 in the 2010 FIFA World Cup qualification match against Morocco national football team. Iranzi's first international goal came on 26 March 2011 as part of Rwanda's 2012 Africa Cup of Nations qualification campaign. The goal, scored in the 44th minute, gave Rwanda a 1–0 lead over regional rival Burundi. Rwanda went on to win the match 3–1.

Career statistics

 
Scores and results list Rwanda's goal tally first, score column indicates score after each Iranzi goal.

Honours
APR FC
Rwandan Premier League: 2009–10, 2010–11
Rwandan Cup: 2010

External links
Futbalnet profile

References

1990 births
Living people
People from Kigali
Rwandan footballers
Association football forwards
Rwanda international footballers
3. Liga (Slovakia) players
S.C. Kiyovu Sports players
APR F.C. players
MFK Topvar Topoľčany players
ZESCO United F.C. players
Rayon Sports F.C. players
Aswan SC players
Rwandan expatriate footballers
Rwandan expatriate sportspeople in Slovakia
Expatriate footballers in Slovakia
Rwandan expatriate sportspeople in Zambia
Expatriate footballers in Zambia
Rwandan expatriate sportspeople in Egypt
Expatriate footballers in Egypt
Rwanda A' international footballers
2011 African Nations Championship players
2016 African Nations Championship players